Ferrari has used the Superamerica name on a number of high-end products:
 1956 410 Superamerica
 1960 400 Superamerica
 2005 Superamerica (Ferrari 575M-based limited production)
 2010 Superamerica 45 (Ferrari 599 GTB-based one-off)